The women's long jump event at the 2006 Commonwealth Games was held on 22–24 March.

Medalists

Results

Qualification
Qualification: 6.50 m (Q) or at least 12 best (q) qualified for the final.

Final

References
Results

Long
2006
2006 in women's athletics